Ammianus is a genus of lace bugs in the family Tingidae. There are at least 40 described species in Ammianus.

Species
These 41 species belong to the genus Ammianus:

References

Further reading

 
 
 
 
 
 
 
 
 
 
 

Tingidae
Articles created by Qbugbot